The Twenty-first Dynasty of Egypt (notated Dynasty XXI, alternatively 21st Dynasty or Dynasty 21) is usually classified as the first Dynasty of the Ancient Egyptian Third Intermediate Period, lasting from 1077 BC to 943 BC.

History 
After the reign of Ramesses III, a long, slow decline of royal power in Egypt followed. The pharaohs of the Twenty-first Dynasty ruled from Tanis, but were mostly active only in Lower Egypt, which they controlled. This dynasty is described as 'Tanite' because its political capital was based at Tanis. Meanwhile, the High Priests of Amun at Thebes effectively ruled Middle and Upper Egypt in all but name. The later Egyptian Priest Manetho of Sebennytos states in his Epitome on Egyptian royal history that "the 21st Dynasty of Egypt lasted for 130 years".

Pharaohs of the 21st Dynasty

Timeline of the 21st Dynasty

Footnotes

Further reading
 Jaroslav Černý, Studies in the Chronology of the Twenty-First Dynasty, JEA 32 (1946), 24-30

See also 
 Family tree of the Twenty-first, Twenty-second, and Twenty-third Dynasties of Egypt
 Theban High Priests of Amun

External links 
 http://www.narmer.pl/dyn/21en.htm

 
States and territories established in the 11th century BC
States and territories disestablished in the 10th century BC
21
Nile Delta
11th century BC in Egypt
10th century BC in Egypt
11th-century BC establishments in Egypt
10th-century BC disestablishments in Egypt
21
21
Tanis